The 2017 Masters Tournament was the 81st edition of the Masters Tournament and the first of golf's four major championships in 2017. It was held  at Augusta National Golf Club in Augusta, Georgia.

Sergio García defeated Justin Rose in a sudden-death playoff, after they both completed the 72 holes in nine-under-par. This was his first major title, which came in his 74th attempt. Previously, García had 22 top-ten finishes in majors (including three at the Masters, the best a tie for fourth in 2004). He was the first Spaniard to win at Augusta in eighteen years, since José María Olazábal

Course

Field
The Masters has the smallest field of the four major championships. Officially, the Masters remains an invitation event, but there is a set of qualifying criteria that determines who is included in the field. Each player is classified according to the first category by which he qualified, with other categories in which he qualified shown in parentheses.

Golfers who qualify based solely on their performance in amateur tournaments (categories 7–11) must remain amateurs on the starting day of the tournament to be eligible to play.

1. Past Masters Champions
Ángel Cabrera, Fred Couples, Trevor Immelman, Zach Johnson (3,18,19), Bernhard Langer, Sandy Lyle, Phil Mickelson (3,14,17,18,19), Larry Mize, José María Olazábal, Mark O'Meara, Charl Schwartzel (17,18,19), Adam Scott (17,18,19), Vijay Singh, Jordan Spieth (2,12,16,17,18,19), Bubba Watson (17,18,19), Mike Weir, Danny Willett (12,18,19), Ian Woosnam
Tiger Woods withdrew due to a back injury.
The following past champions did not enter: Tommy Aaron, Jack Burke Jr., Charles Coody, Ben Crenshaw, Nick Faldo, Raymond Floyd, Doug Ford, Bob Goalby, Jack Nicklaus, Gary Player, Craig Stadler, Tom Watson, Fuzzy Zoeller.

2. Winners of the last five U.S. Opens
Martin Kaymer (5,19), Justin Rose (6,12,18,19), Webb Simpson
Dustin Johnson (12,13,16,17,18,19) withdrew after sustaining a back injury the day before the tournament.

3. Winners of the last five British Opens
Ernie Els, Rory McIlroy (4,12,16,17,18,19), Henrik Stenson (14,18,19)

4. Winners of the last five PGA Championships 
Jason Day (5,12,15,16,17,18,19), Jason Dufner (17), Jimmy Walker (15,17,18,19)

5. Winners of the last three The Players Championships
Rickie Fowler (16,18,19)

6. Winner of the 2016 Olympic Golf Tournament
Eligible under category 2

7. Top two finishers in the 2016 U.S. Amateur
Brad Dalke (a), Curtis Luck (a,9)

8. Winner of the 2016 Amateur Championship
Scott Gregory (a)

9. Winner of the 2016 Asia-Pacific Amateur Championship
Eligible under category 7

10. Winner of the 2017 Latin America Amateur Championship
Toto Gana (a)

11. Winner of the 2016 U.S. Mid-Amateur
Stewart Hagestad (a)

12. The top 12 finishers and ties in the 2016 Masters Tournament
Daniel Berger (16,17,18,19), Paul Casey (17,18,19), Matt Fitzpatrick (18,19), J. B. Holmes (14,17,18,19), Søren Kjeldsen (18), Hideki Matsuyama (15,16,17,18,19), Brandt Snedeker (17,18,19), Lee Westwood (18)

13. Top 4 finishers and ties in the 2016 U.S. Open
Jim Furyk (18), Shane Lowry (18), Scott Piercy (18,19)

14. Top 4 finishers and ties in the 2016 British Open Championship
Steve Stricker

15. Top 4 finishers and ties in the 2016 PGA Championship
Branden Grace (15,16,18,19), Brooks Koepka (18,19), Daniel Summerhays

16. Winners of PGA Tour events that award a full-point allocation for the FedEx Cup, between the 2016 Masters Tournament and the 2017 Masters Tournament
Sergio García (18,19), Adam Hadwin (19), James Hahn, Russell Henley, Charley Hoffman, Mackenzie Hughes, Billy Hurley III, Kim Si-woo (17), Russell Knox (17,18,19), Marc Leishman (19), William McGirt (17,18), Ryan Moore (17,18,19), Rod Pampling, Pat Perez, Jon Rahm (19), Patrick Reed (17,18,19), Brendan Steele, Brian Stuard, Hudson Swafford, Justin Thomas (17,18,19), Jhonattan Vegas (17)

17. All players qualifying for the 2016 edition of the Tour Championship
Roberto Castro, Kevin Chappell (18,19), Emiliano Grillo (18,19), Kevin Kisner (19), Matt Kuchar (18,19), Kevin Na (18), Sean O'Hair, Gary Woodland (18,19)

18. Top 50 on the final 2016 Official World Golf Ranking list
An Byeong-hun, Rafa Cabrera-Bello (19), Bill Haas (19), Tyrrell Hatton (19), Yuta Ikeda (19), Francesco Molinari (19), Alex Norén (19), Louis Oosthuizen (19), Thomas Pieters (19), Andy Sullivan, Bernd Wiesberger (19), Chris Wood

19. Top 50 on the Official World Golf Ranking list on March 27
Ross Fisher, Tommy Fleetwood, Hideto Tanihara, Wang Jeung-hun

20. International invitees
None

All five amateurs were appearing in their first Masters, as were fourteen professionals: Tommy Fleetwood, Adam Hadwin, Tyrrell Hatton, Mackenzie Hughes, Billy Hurley III, Kim Si-woo, William McGirt, Alex Norén, Thomas Pieters, Jon Rahm, Brian Stuard, Daniel Summerhays, Hudson Swafford, and Wang Jeung-hun.  All the professionals, and Scott Gregory, had previously appeared in a major.

Par 3 contest
Wednesday, April 5, 2017

Heavy rain forced the cancellation of the Par-3 contest for the first time in its history. Mike Weir recorded the only hole-in-one before play was suspended.

Round summaries

First round
Thursday, April 6, 2017

After being one-over after five holes, Charley Hoffman birdied eight of his next twelve holes for 65 (−7). His four-stroke advantage after the first round was the largest at the Masters since 1955.

Second round
Friday, April 7, 2017

Charley Hoffman fell back to the pack with 75 and into a four-way tie for the lead at  Rickie Fowler had four birdies and an eagle on his way to a round of 67 (−5), the lowest score of the round, and tied for the lead along with Sergio García and Thomas Pieters. García was originally credited with a triple-bogey seven on the 10th, but his score was later corrected to a five. Fifteen players were within five shots of the lead, including past champions Fred Couples, Phil Mickelson, Adam Scott, and Jordan Spieth. Amateur Stewart Hagestad became the first U.S. Mid-Amateur champion to make the cut at the Masters since the winner of that tournament was granted entry in 1989.

Amateurs: Hagestad (+3), Luck (+6), Dalke (+9), Gregory (+13), Gana (+17)

Third round
Saturday, April 8, 2017

Justin Rose birdied five of his final seven holes for 67 (−5), the lowest of the round, and tied Sergio García for the lead. Charley Hoffman held solo possession of the lead before a bogey at 14 and double-bogey at 16 after hitting his tee shot in the water, finishing two shots behind. Jordan Spieth was five-under on his round and within a shot of the lead until a bogey at 18 tied him with Hoffman.

Amateurs: Hagestad (+5), Luck (+9)

Final round
Sunday, April 9, 2017

Summary
Sergio García birdied two of his first three holes to open up a three-shot lead. Starting at the 6th, Justin Rose recorded three consecutive birdies to tie; with bogeys by García at the 10th and 11th, Rose went ahead by two shots. At the 13th, García was forced to take a drop when his tee shot found the trees, but was able to get up and down to save par while Rose missed his birdie attempt. After converting the eagle attempt, he once again tied Rose, who made birdie. On the par-3 16th, both hit approaches to within , and Rose made his birdie from 7 feet, while García missed his gimme three-footer. At the 17th, however, Rose found the greenside bunker and suffered a bogey while Garcia two-putted for par, once again tying for the lead heading to the last hole.

Charl Schwartzel, the 2011 champion, had four birdies on the back-nine for 68 (−4) and third place, three shots behind García and Rose. Thomas Pieters also shot 68 after making four straight birdies on holes 12–15 and tied for fourth place. Matt Kuchar birdied three consecutive holes on his final nine, then made a hole-in-one at 16 to equal the lowest score of the round with 67 and tied Pieters. Rickie Fowler began the round a shot out of the lead, but seven bogeys yielded a  76 (+4) and dropped him to eleventh, while 2015 champion Jordan Spieth, two back at the start of the round, shot 75 and tied Fowler. (He was six-over for the round and then birdied three of the last four.) Charley Hoffman carded 41 on the final nine for 78 and tied for 22nd place.

After García took his drop on 13, some TV viewers reported the possibility that he caused his ball to move while removing some pine straw near his ball.  Prior to the conclusion of the round Masters Officials determined there was no penalty. Per Rule 18-2 (Decision 18/4) even if high definition TV camera evidence shows movement, there is no penalty if it is deemed that the movement was not reasonably discernible to the naked eye at the time.

Final leaderboard

Scorecard

Cumulative tournament scores, relative to par
{|class="wikitable" span = 50 style="font-size:85%;
|-
|style="background: Red;" width=10|
|Eagle
|style="background: Pink;" width=10|
|Birdie
|style="background: PaleGreen;" width=10|
|Bogey
|style="background: Green;" width=10|
|Double bogey
|}

Playoff
The sudden-death playoff began at the par four 18th; Rose's drive found the trees and he was forced to chip out. Rose missed the putt, giving García two putts to win the championship, but he converted the birdie to win his first major championship. The win came in García's 19th Masters appearance and 74th major, the most by any player before their first title.

References

External links

Coverage on the PGA Tour's official site
Coverage on the European Tour's official site
Coverage from the PGA of America

2017
2017 in golf
2017 in American sports
2017 in sports in Georgia (U.S. state)
April 2017 sports events in the United States